Nations Park is an open invitational baseball tournament complex located in the city of Newberry, Florida opening in the summer of 2012. The park was formed with partnerships between the City of Newberry, Nations Baseball Florida Inc., and the Alachua County Tourism Development Board. The facility has 16 stadiums.

History
Lou Presutti, founder of Cooperstown Dreams Park came to the City of Newberry in 2009 to establish the park.  It completed construction in 2012, but the grand opening was delayed until March 2013.

Nations Park is a $7 million baseball tournament complex that is built on 40 acres of land donated by the Davis family on the corner of US 41/27 and SW 30th Ave. In July 2011, the construction of Nations Park came to a brief stop upon discovery of several endangered Gopher Tortoises. The construction remained on hold for several weeks while experts were brought on site to relocate the protected species to a tortoise sanctuary. The 16 fields for Nations Park are completed as of April, 2012 and are ready to play for the inaugural 2012 tournaments.

Stadiums
The 16 stadiums at Nations Park are built for multiple age groups, 8- to 14-year-old baseball players and 12- to 14-year-old girls fastpitch softball players.  The stadiums are fully enclosed and have natural grass outfields and synthetic turf infields. In each stadium, the mounds and basepaths are all adjustable to accompany the correct age group and boasts 220' foot walls and a scorer's tower.

Tournaments
Nations Park will host week-long summer and holiday tournaments for American and Canadian boys' baseball and girls' fastpitch softball teams.>

Tournament Schedule, Summer 2012
 June 30- July 5 (13U)
 July 7–12 (13U)
 July 28- August 2 (12U)

Economic Impact
The park was expected to have huge economical impact on the small city of Newberry. Nations Park is projected to attract between 90,000 and 120,000 people to Newberry each summer. Once completed, the park may pump an estimated $20 million into the local economy. The park will help generate an additional 50,000 to 80,000 local room nights per year that will supplement the city's tourism revenue.

Expansion
There are plans in the future to expand Nations Park to 32 fields.  The city of Newberry, Nations Baseball Florida Inc., and the Alachua County Tourism Development Board will have to gain more tourism revenue needed for an expansion.

External links
 Official website

References

Buildings and structures in Alachua County, Florida
Baseball venues in Florida
Sports venues completed in 2012
2012 establishments in Florida